The Canal de la Haute Colme is a canal in northern France.  The haute Colme corresponds to the western segment of the Canal de la Colme.  The channel connects the river Aa at Watten to Canal de Bergues and Canal de la Basse Colme at Bergues. Between Watten and Cappelle-Brouck, it is part of the Canal Dunkerque-Escaut.

See also
List of canals in France

References

Canals in France
Buildings and structures in Nord (French department)
Canals opened in 1753